The EURONICS European Masters was an annual bonspiel, or curling tournament, that takes place at the Sports Center Lerchenfeld in St. Gallen, Switzerland. The tournament, held as the final event of the Curling Champions Tour, started in 2013. A women's event was added in 2015. It was last held in 2017. St. Gallen would not host a World Curling Tour event again until 2022 with the creation of the St. Galler Elite Challenge.

Past champions

Men's event

Notes
  Gray skipped in place of David Murdoch, who sat out for health reasons.

Women's event

References

External links

Champions

 
Former World Curling Tour events
Curling competitions in Switzerland
Sport in St. Gallen (city)
Champions Curling Tour events